Disgorge Mexico: The DVD is the first video release by Canadian grindcore band Fuck the Facts. The DVD has two parts. The first part is a multi-camera recording of the August 2, 2008 concert in which the band performed their then-newest album Disgorge Mexico live in its entirety. The second part is Disgorge, Mexico: The Movie, a film made by Canadian filmmaker David Hall that is set to the studio recordings of Disgorge Mexico. It includes all of the selections from the album except the first track "Borders."

The film is described by Hall as "a substance abuse art house riff on the destructive and volatile nature of love." The film follows a woman's strange journey with a violent, hallucinatory depiction. On November 5, Metal Injection debuted a clip from the film featuring the song "Kelowna." A quote included with the clip provided information about the content of the film:

Track listing

"Metallica Fridays with Psyopus" is a performance of two Metallica songs ("Master of Puppets" and "Creeping Death") by members from Fuck the Facts and Pysopus:
From Fuck the Facts
Mathieu Vilandré – vocals
Marc Bourgon – vocals
Johnny Ibay – guitar
From Psyopus
Mike Horn – bass
Jason Bauers – drums
Chris Arp – guitar

Release
The film was released by Handshake Inc. and Nictophobia Films in conjunction with the band who produced the actual DVDs. It was limited to 500 copies, and included a bonus DVD with the first 100 copies.

Reception

Blabbermouth gave the film an 8.5 out of 10, noting the quality of live performance as well as the disturbing nature of Disgorge, Mexico: The Movie.

References

Fuck the Facts albums
2010 video albums
Live video albums
2010 live albums